The Flemish Tram and Bus Museum (Dutch: Vlaams Tram- en Autobusmuseum, abbreviated as VlaTAM) is a museum of public transport that exhibits historical trams and buses. The museum is situated in the Berchem district of Antwerp, in the former tram shed of Groenenhoek.

The museum is supported by transport company De Lijn. It mainly exhibits trams and buses of the Vicinal company, the city tram companies of Antwerp and Ghent, and the various subcontractors of Vicinal and De Lijn. Its collection includes the only surviving gyrobus in the world and the first electric tram built for Antwerp, as well as numerous other artefacts connected to the history of public transport in Belgium. 

The museum reopened to the general public on 16 June 2019 after renovation of the roof of the building. The archives and the library of the museum are open by appointment.

External links
 

Museums in Flanders
Museums in Antwerp
Tram museums